The Oneida Stake Academy was a secondary school operated by the Oneida Stake of the Church of Jesus Christ of Latter-day Saints (LDS Church) from 1888 to 1922. The academy building was constructed in Preston, Idaho, in 1895, after the stake headquarters moved from Franklin, Idaho, in 1889.

Among its alumni were Ezra Taft Benson and Harold B. Lee, both of whom were later presidents of the church. Medal of Honor recipients Mervyn S. Bennion, Leonard Brostrom and Junior Van Noy also attended the school.

Following the emergence of the LDS seminaries and better-equipped public schools, the LDS Church decided to close its system of secondary academies. In 1922, the Oneida Stake Academy was dissolved, although the public school system continued to use the building until 1990.

In 2003, the building was moved using funds raised by the Mormon Historic Sites Foundation to a new site called Benson Park that had been donated by the LDS Church.

References

External links

Oneida Stake Academy official website

1888 establishments in Idaho Territory
1922 disestablishments in Idaho
Defunct schools in Idaho
Educational institutions established in 1888
Buildings and structures in Franklin County, Idaho
School buildings on the National Register of Historic Places in Idaho
National Register of Historic Places in Franklin County, Idaho